Divinely Uninspired to a Hellish Extent is the debut studio album by Scottish singer-songwriter Lewis Capaldi. It was released on 17 May 2019 through Vertigo Records in Europe and Capitol Records in the United States, and distributed globally by Universal Music. It includes the top 10 single "Grace", the UK and US number one single "Someone You Loved" and the album's lead single "Hold Me While You Wait", among several songs previously included on Capaldi's 2018 EPs Bloom and Breach. Capaldi went on a world tour in support of the record in May 2019, and finished the tour in October 2019. It peaked at number one in the UK and Ireland, becoming the fastest-selling album of the year and also outselling all of the top 10 combined in both countries. It was certified gold in the UK a week after its release. The album was the best selling album in the UK in 2019 and 2020, with "Someone You Loved" being the best selling single of 2019 in the UK.

Background
In the album announcement, Capaldi said: "Everyone always tells you about how amazing recording their first album was and how they'll always look back on the 'process' with fond memories. I will look back on it as an extremely stressful time that somehow also managed to be extremely boring." He went on to describe that while he liked "building up the songs", he did not enjoy re-recording guitar parts and the long mixing process. Capaldi also joked that he did not think that when he got to release his debut album that he "would give it a name as stupid I have, but here we are". MTV said Capaldi "might have just won Best Album Title of 2019".

The album title comes from a lyric in an unreleased song called “Figure it Out”.

Critical reception

Ben Beaumont-Thomas of The Guardian said that "few artists have quite such a disparity between their music and their public persona" as Capaldi, who, in song, is "a man utterly battered by a breakup". He called Capaldi's honesty "appealing" and felt that there is "some solid songwriting here, and a nobility to the sheer honesty of the lyrics", describing the music as "full-force, ugly crying pop". Roisin O'Connor of The Independent called Capaldi's voice "a gravelly powerhouse that manages to evoke the 22-year-old's natural charisma even on the weepiest of ballads" and said the album "alternates between piano and guitar-based tracks, with production that retains raw moments" that, while "not the most adventurous album [...] is more about unveiling the rough materials Capaldi has to work with". Hayley Milross from The Line of Best Fit called the album "an assured and settled debut", saying that while Capaldi may not have "deliver[ed] an album that leans towards the extraordinary", it is a "collection of poignant love songs that are honest and sincere".

Robin Murray of Clash questioned why Capaldi's music is "so boring" given his "hilarious" public persona. Murray judged that the album "isn't something anyone should hate. It's well produced, well played, and for the more part well written, if highly repetitive in its he said/she said subject matter", saying its "refusal to be disliked" is "perhaps its most dispiriting, irritating aspect". Writing for NME, Jordan Bassett characterised the album as "emotional piano ballads" that "sit at stark contrast with his public persona", concluding that it is "somewhat baffling that such a charismatic star could make a record so lacking in personality, though his fans won't mind one bit".

Commercial performance
The album became the second fastest-selling album of the year in Ireland after three days of availability. The album started atop the Irish Albums Chart with 6,389 units (physical sales, downloads and streaming). It later became the fastest-selling album of the year, the decade and the fourth all-time in the country. 

The album has reached over 10 million sales worldwide.

Track listing
Adapted from iTunes.

Personnel
Credits adapted from the liner notes of Divinely Uninspired to a Hellish Extent.

Vocals and production

 Lewis Capaldi – lead vocals, backing vocals, production
 Nicolas Atkinson – backing vocals
 TMS – production
 Nicolas Atkinson – production
 Edd Holloway – production
 James Earp – production
 Anu Pilai – production
 Malay Ho – production
 Phil Cook – production
 Joe Janiak – production
 Andrew Frampton – production

Technical

 Spike Stent – mixing
 Edd Holloway – mixing
 Mike Cave – mixing
 Robert Voseign – mastering
 Mike Cave – mastering
 Lewis Capaldi – executive producer
 Ryan Walter – executive producer

Artwork
 Alexandra Gavillet – photography
 Rory Dewar – art design
 Dan Sanders – art commission

Charts

Weekly charts

Year-end charts

Certifications

References

2019 debut albums
Lewis Capaldi albums
Albums produced by Malay (record producer)
Capitol Records albums
Universal Music Group albums
Vertigo Records albums
Albums produced by TMS (production team)